Ground of Being may refer to
Georg Wilhelm Friedrich Hegel#Absolute spirit
Ground (Dzogchen)
Paul Tillich#God as the ground of being
Brahman in Hinduism, the metaphysical ground of all being

See also
Theistic Personalism